Timbuktu Chronicles is the collective name for a group of writings created in Timbuktu in the second half of the 17th century. They form a distinct genre of taʾrīkh (history). There are three surviving works and a probable lost one.

Tarikh al-Sudan, "History of the Sudan" (c. 1655), written by al-Saʿdi
Tarikh al-fattash, "The Researcher's Chronicle" (late 17th century), also called the Tarikh Ibn al-Mukhtar ("Ibn al-Mukhtar's Chronicle")
Notice historique (between 1657 and 1669), an anonymous untitled text conventionally known by the title of the French translation
Durar al-hisan fi akhbar baʿd muluk al-Sudan, "Pearls of Beauties Concerning What is Related About Some Kings of the Sudan", by Baba Goro, a lost work that probably belonged to the Timbuktu taʾrīkh genre.

See also
Timbuktu Manuscripts

Notes

Bibliography

 
 
 

Timbuktu in popular culture
History of West Africa
African chronicles